This is a list of released and upcoming video games that are developed in the Portugal.

P
G